Salmon Brook is the name of a census-designated place (CDP) corresponding to the village of Granby, the primary settlement of the town of Granby, Connecticut, in Hartford County. The population of the CDP was 2,324 as of the 2010 census.

Geography
Salmon Brook is a stream that flows to the east of Granby village, leading south to the Farmington River.

The village is located at the intersection of several major roads. U.S. Route 202 and Connecticut Route 10 pass north–south through the village, leading north to Westfield, Massachusetts, and south to Simsbury. Connecticut Route 20 passes east–west through the village, leading east to Bradley International Airport and Windsor Locks and west towards Winsted. Connecticut Route 189 leads northwest from Granby/Salmon Brook to Granville, Massachusetts, and southeast via Tariffville and Bloomfield to Hartford. All of the highways converge at the Granby Green in the center of the village.

Demographics
As of the census of 2000, there were 2,453 people, 988 households, and 672 families residing in the CDP. The racial makeup of the CDP was 98.08% White, 0.24% African American, 0.16% Native American, 0.49% Asian, 0.04% Pacific Islander, 0.33% from other races, and 0.65% from two or more races. Hispanic or Latino of any race were 1.14% of the population.

There were 988 households, out of which 32.2% had children under the age of 18 living with them, 58.2% were married couples living together, 7.7% had a female householder with no husband present, and 31.9% were non-families. 26.9% of all households were made up of individuals, and 13.3% had someone living alone who was 65 years of age or older.  The average household size was 2.39 and the average family size was 2.92.

In the CDP, the population was spread out, with 23.7% under the age of 18, 3.3% from 18 to 24, 29.9% from 25 to 44, 24.3% from 45 to 64, and 18.8% who were 65 years of age or older.  The median age was 41 years. For every 100 females, there were 87.8 males.  For every 100 females age 18 and over, there were 83.5 males.

The median income for a household in the CDP was $67,500, and the median income for a family was $80,945. Males had a median income of $57,424 versus $40,307 for females. The per capita income for the CDP was $32,311.  About 3.1% of families and 6.0% of the population were below the poverty line, including 10.0% of those under age 18 and 7.3% of those age 65 or over.

References 

Census-designated places in Hartford County, Connecticut
Neighborhoods in Connecticut
Census-designated places in Connecticut